Chhaju Ram Memorial Jat College, Hisar or CRM JAT College, Hisar is a college located near Hisar Junction railway station in Hisar in the Indian state of Haryana

History
This privately funded and not-for-profit trust run institute has its origins in the philanthropic legacy of the prominent Jat businessman Seth Chhaju Ram (1881-1945) who made fortune in Calcatta during the British Raj. The Chhaju Ram Jat High School, Hisar was founded in 1928, and a portion of it was separated and upgraded to the Chhaju Ram Jat College by the Chhaju  Ram Memorial Jat College Managing Committee, Hisar in 1967.

Details
CRM JAT College, Hisar offer undergraduate and post-graduate courses in arts, commerce, science, electronics and computers, the college has produced many IAS, IPS, Army officers and MLAs, it is one of the best colleges in Hisar district, once became infamous due to serious political activities, now a peaceful and good institute.

See also 
 List of Universities and Colleges in Hisar
 List of schools in Hisar
 List of institutions of higher education in Haryana

External links 
 
 Google map

References 

Universities and colleges in Hisar (city)